Mullah Abdullah Sarhadi is an Afghan Taliban politician who is currently serving as governor of Bamyan province since 7 November 2021. He belongs to Zabul province. He has also served as commander of the special unites during the Islamic Emirate of Afghanistan (1996–2001).

References

Living people
Year of birth missing (living people)
Taliban governors
Governors of Bamyan Province
People from Zabul Province
Taliban commanders